The 1955 World Table Tennis Championships were held in Utrecht from April 16 to April 24, 1955.

Medalists

Team

Individual

References

External links
ITTF Museum

 
World Table Tennis Championships
World Table Tennis Championships
World Table Tennis Championships
Table tennis competitions in the Netherlands
International sports competitions hosted by the Netherlands